Bangalaia chaerila is a species of beetle in the family Cerambycidae. It was described by Karl Jordan in 1903. It is known from Cameroon, Angola, Gabon, and the Democratic Republic of the Congo. It contains the variety Bangalaia chaerila var. viridis.

References

Prosopocerini
Beetles described in 1903